Herpetopoma lischkei is a species of sea snail, a marine gastropod mollusk in the family Chilodontidae.

Description
The height of the shell attains 22 mm.

Distribution
This marine species occurs off Japan and the Philippines.

References

  Higo, S., Callomon, P. & Goto, Y. (1999) Catalogue and Bibliography of the Marine Shell-Bearing Mollusca of Japan. Elle Scientific Publications, Yao, Japan, 749 pp

External links
 To Encyclopedia of Life
 To World Register of Marine Species
 

lischkei
Gastropods described in 1904